Essen is a city in the Ruhr area of Germany.

Essen may also refer to:

 Spiel or Essen, a game fair held in Essen, Germany
 Essen (surname)
 Essen, Belgium, a municipality in Antwerp, Belgium
 Essen (Oldenburg), a municipality in Cloppenburg, Lower Saxony, Germany
 Essen, Groningen, a hamlet in the Netherlands
 Essen, Gelderland, a village in Gelderland, the Netherlands
 , a West German fishing trawler in service 1945-56

See also
Bad Essen, in the district of Osnabrück, Lower Saxony
 Esen (disambiguation)
 Assen, a city in the Netherlands